José da Luz Ferraz (born 13 August 1949) is a Portuguese professional football player and manager.

Career
He played for the Portuguese and Dutch clubs. After the end of his playing career he also worked with the Portuguese and Dutch clubs.

Since 2003 until 2007 he was a head coach of the São Tomé and Príncipe national football team. In 2007 he took over Angolan Premiere League Club Progresso Associação do Sambizanga

References

External links
 Jose Ferraz Interview

1949 births
Living people
Portuguese footballers
Association football midfielders
Portuguese football managers
São Tomé and Príncipe national football team managers
Place of birth missing (living people)
SC Vianense managers